The Tatoosh Islands are a small group of islands north of Ketchikan in Southeast Alaska.

Islands of Alaska
Islands of Ketchikan Gateway Borough, Alaska